Ausa or AUSA may refer to:

Places
 Ausa (town), a town in Maharashtra, India
 Ausa (Vidhan Sabha constituency)
 Ausa (river), in San Marino and Italy
 Ausa (Udine), a river in Italy
 Ausa, older name for Vic, a city in Catalonia, Spain

Organisations
 Aberdeen University Students' Association
 Adelaide University Sports Association
 Argentina Urbana SA, a highway consortium during the government of Buenos Aires mayor Osvaldo Cacciatore
 Army of the United States, the version of the US Army with conscription
 Association of the United States Army, a non-profit, the professional association of the United States Army
 Auckland University Students' Association
 Automóviles Utilitarios S. A. a Spanish industrial vehicle manufacturer

Other uses
 Anime USA, an annual anime convention located in Washington, D.C.
 Assistant United States Attorney
 A.U.S.A., a 2003 NBC television series

See also
 Aussa (disambiguation)